Poppy J Stockwell (born 24 October 2003) is an Australian sportswoman. She plays cricket as a right-handed batter and wicket-keeper for Western Australia in the Women's National Cricket League (WNCL). She also plays Australian rules football as a half-forward for South Fremantle.

Cricket career
Stockwell made her debut for Western Australia on 27 February 2022, against South Australia in the WNCL, scoring 25 from 31 balls. She played one more match for the side that season, scoring 9 against Queensland. She played three matches for the side in the 2022–23 WNCL.

References

External links

2003 births
Living people
Place of birth missing (living people)
Australian women cricketers
Western Australia women cricketers
South Fremantle Football Club players